Al-Kisā’ī  Abū al-Ḥasan ‘Alī ibn Ḥamzah ibn ‘Abd Allāh ibn ‘Uthman, called Bahman ibn Fīrūz, surnamed Abū ‘Abd Allāh, and Abū al-Ḥasan ‘Alī ibn Hamzah of al-Kūfah ( d. ca. 804 or 812) was preceptor to the sons of caliph Hārūn al-Rashīd and one of the ‘Seven Readers’ (seven canonical Qira'at) or ‘authorized’ Qur’ānic reader. He founded the Kufi school of Arabic grammar, the rival philology school to the Basri school founded by Sibawayh.

Life
A Persian native of al-Kūfah, he learned grammar from al-Ru’āsī  and a group of other scholars.  It is said that al-Kisā’ī took this moniker from the particular kind of mantle he wore called a kisā’. 

Al-Kisā’ī  entered the court of the Abbāsid caliph Hārūn al-Rashīd at Baghdād as tutor to the two princes, al-Ma’mūn and al-Amīn.  His early biographer Al-Nadim relates Abū al-Ṭayyib's written account that Al-Rashīd held him in highest esteem.   When the caliph moved the court to al-Rayy as the capital of Khurāsān, al-Kisā’ī moved there but subsequently became ill and died.  During his illness al-Rashīd paid him regular visits and deeply mourned his death. It seems he died in 804 (189 AH) on the day that the hanīfah official of Al-Rashīd, Muḥammad al-Shaybānī also died. It is also said he shared his date of death with the judge Abū Yūsuf in 812 (197 AH).
When al-Kisā’ī died al-Farrā' was elected to teach in his stead, according to the account of Ibn al-Kūfī.

Rival Schools
A famous anecdote relates a grammatical contest in Baghdad between the leaders of the two rival schools, with al-Kisā’ī representative of Al-Kufah, and Sibawayh of the Baṣrans. The debate was organized by the Abbasid vizier Yahya ibn Khalid, and became known as al-Mas'ala al-Zunburīyah (The Question of the Hornet). At issue was the Arabic phrase: كنتُ أظن أن العقربَ أشد لسعة من الزنبور فإذا هو هي\هو إياها I always thought that the scorpion is more painful than the hornet in its sting, and so it is (lit. translation). At issue was the correct declension of the last word in the sentence. Sibawayh proposed:
... fa-'ida huwa hiya (فإذا هو هي), literally ... sure-enough he shemeaning "so he (the scorpion, masc.) is she (the most painful one, fem.)"; In Arabic syntax the predicative copula of the verb 'to be' or is  has no direct analogue, and instead employs nominal inflexion.  Al-Kisa'i argued the correct form is:... fa-'ida huwa 'iyyaha(فإذا هو إياها), literally ... sure-enough he her meaning "he is her".

In Sibawayh's theoretical argument the accusative form can never be the predicate. However, when al-Kisa'i was supported in his assertion by four Bedouin -Desert Arab, whom he had supposedly bribed- that the correct form was huwa 'iyyaha, his argument won the debate. Such was Sibawayh's bitterness in defeat, he left the court to return to his country where he died sometime later at a young age. Al-Kisa'i was accosted by one of Sibawayh's students after the fact and asked 100 grammatical questions, being proved wrong by the student each time. Upon being told the news about Sibawayh's death, al-Kisa'i approached the Caliph Harun al-Rashid and requested that he be punished for having a share in "killing Sibawayh."

Legacy
Hishām ibn Mu'āwīyah and Yaḥya al-Farrā' were two notable students. The primary transmitters of his recitation method were Abū al-Ḥārith ibn Khālid al-Layth (d.845) and Al-Duri  

Al-Naqqāsh wrote Al-Kitāb al-Kisā’ī.and Bakkār wrote The Reading of al- Kisā’ī.

Works

Among his books there were:
Kitāb Ma'ānī al-Qur'an 'The Meaning of the Qur’an';
Kitāb Makhtusir al-Nawh 'Abridgment of Grammar';
Kitāb al-Qirā'āt '[Qur’ānic] Readings';
Kitāb al'Addad 'Numbers';
Kitāb al-Nawādir al-Kabīr 'The large book, Rare Forms'; 
Kitāb al-Nawādir al-Awsat() 'The medium-size book, Rare Forms';
Kitāb al-Nawādir al-Asghir 'The small book, Rare Forms';
Kitāb al-Muqtu' wa-Musulahu 'Terminations and Connections in the Qur’ān';
Kitāb Ikhtilāf al-'Addad 'Disagreement or Discrepancies of Numbers';
Kitāb al-Huja 'Spelling';
Kitāb al-Musādir 'Nouns';
Kitāb Ash'ār al-Mu'āyāh wa-Tarā'iqha 'Poems of Contention and Their Forms';
Kitāb al-Hā'āt al-Makani biha fi al-Qur'an 'Forms of Surnames in the Qur’an';
Kitāb al-Huruf 'Letters'.

Al-Kisā’ī composed ten leaves of poetry.

See also

List of Arab scientists and scholars
Encyclopædia Britannica Online

Notes

References

Bibliography

 

9th-century deaths
8th-century linguists
8th-century philologists
8th-century scholars
Arabic language
Grammarians of Arabic
Grammarians of Kufa
People from Kufa
Medieval grammarians of Arabic
Philologists of Arabic
Scholars from the Abbasid Caliphate
Sunni Muslim scholars of Islam
8th-century Iranian people
9th-century Iranian people
Iranian grammarians
Iranian scholars